The Journal of Cognitive Psychotherapy is a quarterly peer-reviewed academic journal covering cognitive behavioral therapy. It is published by Springer Publishing. It was formed by the merger of Cognitive Behaviorist and British Journal of Cognitive Psychotherapy.

External links
 

Psychotherapy journals
Quarterly journals
Publications with year of establishment missing
English-language journals
Springer Publishing academic journals
Publications established in 1987